John Mersereau (1898–1989) was an American novelist. Several of his stories were made into films. His novels include The Corpse Comes Ashore, Murder Loves Company, and Whispering Canyon. Whispering Canyon was adapted into the 1926 film Whispering Canyon. He also wrote the novel that the movie The Checkered Flag was based on.

Kirkus Reviews described Murder Loves Company as a murder mystery set at the 1939 Golden Gate International Exposition in San Francisco and rated the work an "averagely good yarn".

John Mersereau Jr. (1925 - 2009) wrote Overdue at Immokalee: A Tale of Preemptive Assassination and several books on Russian literature, poetry, and language.

Bibliography
The Corpse Comes Ashore
Garber of Thunder Gorge by John Mersereau and Whitman Chambers Small, Maynard, 1924
The Checkered Flag, 1925
The Whispering Canyon by John Mersereau, Grosset & Dunlap, 1926
Gill O' the Rangers: A Western Story by John Mersereau, Chelsea House Publishers, 1930
Murder Loves Company

References

1898 births
1989 deaths
20th-century American novelists